Sándor Katona (21 February 1943 in Budapest – 16 May 2009 in Budapest) was a Hungarian footballer. He won a gold medal in the 1964 Summer Olympics in Tokyo.

References

External links
 

1943 births
2009 deaths
Footballers at the 1964 Summer Olympics
Hungarian footballers
Olympic footballers of Hungary
Olympic gold medalists for Hungary
Olympic medalists in football
Medalists at the 1964 Summer Olympics
Footballers from Budapest
Association football forwards
Ferencvárosi TC footballers
Budapest Honvéd FC players